The Men's P1 10 metre air pistol SH1 event at the 2020 Summer Paralympics took place on 31 August at the Asaka Shooting Range in Tokyo.

The event consisted of two rounds: a qualifier and a final.

The top 8 shooters in the qualifying round moved on to the final round.

Records
Prior to this competition, the existing world and Paralympic records were as follows.

Schedule
All times are Japan Standard Time (UTC+9)

Qualification

Final

References

Men's 10 metre air pistol SH1